Parantica cleona is a butterfly endemic to Indonesia which was described by Hans Fruhstorfer in 1892.

Subspecies
P. c. cleona Ambon, Serang
P. c. lutescens (Butler, 1866) (Buru)
P. c. talautica (Piepers & Snellen, 1896) (Talaud)
P. c. lucida Fruhstorfer, 1899 (Sula)
P. c. eucleona Fruhstorfer, 1903 (Obi)
P. c. luciplena Fruhstorfer, 1910 (Sulawesi, Salayar, Wowoni, Buton, Banggai)
P. c. tigrana (Fruhstorfer, 1910) (Halmahera, Bachan)

External links
 Butterflies of Southeastern Sulawesi

Parantica
Butterflies of Indonesia
Endemic fauna of Indonesia
Fauna of Sulawesi
Taxa named by Hans Fruhstorfer
Butterflies described in 1892